The Wisconsin Office of State Employment Relations is the human resources department for state employees. Since 2003 it has been part of the Wisconsin Department of Administration; it had previously been the Wisconsin Department of Employment Relations. As of 2011, its director is Gregory Gracz.

References

Sources 
 State of Wisconsin 2005-2006 Blue Book

External links
 Wisconsin Office of State Employment Relations

Office of State Employment Relations